David John de Laubenfels or D. J. de Laubenfels (1925 – February 6, 2016) was an American botanist known as an expert on tropical conifers.

See also 
 Max Walker de Laubenfels

References

External links 
de Laubenfels website (Archived August 1, 2015)

Botanists with author abbreviations
1925 births
2016 deaths
American botanists